Mark O'Sullivan (born 1973) is an Irish retired Gaelic footballer who played as a full-forward for the Cork senior team.

Born in Newmarket, County Cork, O'Sullivan first arrived on the inter-county scene at the age of seventeen when he first linked up with the Cork minor team in 1991, before lining out with the under-21 side in 1994. Both teams were to win All Ireland titles. Two Sigerson Cup titles followed with UCC in 1994 and 1995. He made his senior debut for Cork in the 1994 championship, and went on to play for the team for the next seven years, winning three Munster medals and one National Football League medal. He was an All-Ireland runner-up on one occasion in the 1999 final.	
	
As a member of the Munster inter-provincial team at various times, O'Sullivan won one Railway Cup medal in 1999. At club level, he is a one-time junior championship medallist with Newmarket in 1998.

Throughout his career, O'Sullivan made 16 championship appearances for Cork. He retired from inter-county football following the conclusion of the 2001 championship.

Honours

Player

Cork Vocational Schools
All-Ireland Vocational Schools Inter-county Championship (1): 1991

Newmarket
Cork Junior Football Championship (1): 1998
Duhallow Junior A Football Championship (2): 1993, 1998

University College Cork
Sigerson Cup (2): 1994, 1995

Cork
All-Ireland Minor Football Championship (1): 1991
All-Ireland Under-21 Football Championship (1): 1994
Munster Senior Football Championship (3): 1994, 1995, 1999
National Football League (1): 1999

Munster
Railway Cup (1): 1999

References

1974 births
Living people
Newmarket Gaelic footballers
Cork inter-county Gaelic footballers
Munster inter-provincial Gaelic footballers